Palaeocarpilius is an extinct genus of crabs belonging to the family Carpiliidae. The type species of this genus is Palaeocarpilius macrocheilus.

These epifaunal carnivores lived in the Eocene and the Oligocene, from 48.6 to 28.4 Ma.

Species
Palaeocarpilius aquitanicus Milne-Edwards 1862
Palaeocarpilius ignotus Milne-Edwards 1862
Palaeocarpilius intermedius Stubblefield 1927
Palaeocarpilius laevis Imaizumi 1939
Palaeocarpilius macrocheilus Desmarest 1822
Palaeocarpilius mississippiensis Rathbun 1935
Palaeocarpilius rugifer Stoliczka 1871
Palaeocarpilius valrovinensis De Gregorio 1895

Distribution
Fossils of this genus have been found in the Eocene of Italy and in the Oligocene of India, Libya and United States.

References

Crabs
Prehistoric Malacostraca
Prehistoric crustacean genera
Eocene crustaceans
Oligocene crustaceans
Fossils of Italy
Fossils of the United States
Fossils of India
Eocene genus first appearances
Rupelian genus extinctions